O'Cleary is the surname of a learned Gaelic Irish family. It is the oldest recorded surname in Europe — dating back to 916 CE — and is cognate with cleric and clerk. The O'Clearys are a sept of the Uí Fiachrach dynasty, who ruled the Kingdom of Connacht for nearly two millennia. As Connachta, the O'Cleary's ruled the kingdom of Uí Fiachrach Aidhne for nearly 800 years. They are the descendants of Fiachrae, son of the High King Eochaid Mugmedon, and elder brother of legendary High King Niall of the Nine Hostages. According to legend, they ultimately trace their ancestry back to the mythical Fir Bolg, as well as to Milesius, and consequently to Japheth, son of Noah.

During the Norman conquest of Ireland, they were expelled from their land and replaced by their cousins the O'Shaughnessy's. From the early 11th or 12th century, they were based in Tír Chonaill, located in modern-day County Donegal, where they served as poet-historians, scribes and secretaries to the O'Donnell dynasty of Tyrconnell. They authored the Ó Cléirigh Book of Genealogies. The clan Cleary and its branches also appeared in Scotland (sometimes known as McCleary), due to the historical connection and exchange between the two countries, much like the Campbells.

Naming conventions

The name has been Anglicised variously as O'Clery, Cleary, Clery, Clark, Clarke and Clarkson.

People with the surname

Ó Cléirigh
 Mac Comhaltan Ua Cleirigh, King of Uí Fiachrach Aidhne, fl. 964
 Lughaidh Ó Cléirigh (fl. 1595–1630)
 Mícheál Ó Cléirigh (ca. 1590–1643), considered the chief author of the chronicle of medieval Irish history known as the Annals of the Four Masters
 Cú Choigcríche Ó Cléirigh (died 1664)

O'Clery
Keyes O'Clery
Conor O'Clery

Cleary
Bernard Cleary (born 1937), Canadian politician
Beverly Cleary (1916–2021), American author
Bill Cleary (born 1934), American hockey player
Brendan Cleary (born 1958), Irish poet
Brian P. Cleary (born 1959), American humorist, poet and author
Daniel Cleary (born 1978), Canadian hockey player
Gabriel Cleary, Irish engineer
Ivan Cleary, rugby league footballer and coach
Joe Cleary (1918–2004), Irish baseball player
John Cleary (disambiguation), several people
Jon Cleary (born 1917), Australian author
Jon Cleary (musician) (born 1962), American musician
Mark Cleary (professor) (born 1954), Vice-Chancellor of the University of Bradford
Michael Cleary, several people
Nikki Cleary (born 1988), American singer
Paul Cleary (born 1976), Australian middle-distance runner 
Phil Cleary (born 1952), Australian commentator 
Patrick Roger Cleary, founder of Cleary University
 Sean Cleary (footballer) (born 1983), Irish football player
 Sean Cleary, Irish rugby league footballer
Thomas Cleary, American author and translator
William J. Cleary (1870–1952), American politician

Clarke
 Austin Clarke (poet) (1896–1974), Irish poet
Henry Edward Clarke (1829–1892), businessman and politician in Ontario, Canada
Henry Joseph Clarke (1833–1889), Premier of Manitoba, Canada, 1874–1878
Peter Clarke (tennis) (born 1979), Irish tennis player
 Philip Clarke (politician) (born 1933), Irish Republican Army member and politician
 Tom Clarke (Irish republican) (1857–1916), executed for his part in the 1916 Rising

Other institutions
 Cleary University, a private business school in Michigan, United States
 Cleary Gottlieb Steen & Hamilton, an international law firm
The Clery Act of United States law
Clerys, an Irish department store

See also
McCleary (surname)

References

Bibliography
 Oxford Concise Companion to Irish Literature, Robert Walsh, 1996. 
 Mícheál Ó Cléirigh, His Associates and St Anthony's College Louvain, Nollaig Ó Muraíle (editor), Four Courts Press, Dublin, 2007.

External links
O'Clery family pedigree at Library Ireland
Ó Cléirigh ancestor search at Irish Times
Clan Ó Cléirigh DNA Project at Family Tree DNA
The O’Clerys: hereditary historians and poets at History Ireland

Surnames
Irish-language surnames
Surnames of Irish origin
Irish families
Irish writers
Irish Brehon families
Families of Irish ancestry